Roger Eylove may refer to:

Roger Eylove (MP for Horsham) in 1395
Roger Eylove (MP for Bletchingley) in 1414 and 1416